Pyrgiscus rufescens is a species of sea snail, a marine gastropod mollusk in the family Pyramidellidae, the pyrams and their allies.

Taxonomy
There is disagreement regarding whether this Pyrgiscus jeffreysii (Jeffreys, 1848) and Pyrgiscus rufescens (Forbes, 1846) represent two different species (e.g.: Høisæter, 2014 and references therein) or variation of the same species (e.g. Nordsieck, 1972). Here Høisæter (2014) is followed and the two species are treated as "accepted".

Distribution
This species occurs in the following locations:
 European waters (ERMS scope)
 United Kingdom Exclusive Economic Zone

References

External links
 To Biodiversity Heritage Library (7 publications)
 To CLEMAM
 To Encyclopedia of Life
 To Marine Species Identification Portal
 To World Register of Marine Species

Pyramidellidae
Gastropods described in 1846